Kulai Municipal Council (Jawi: مجليس ڤربندرن كولاي) is the local authority of Kulai District in Johor, Malaysia. It was formerly known as Kulai District Council (Majlis Daerah Kulai (MDKu) from 1 January 1976 until 20 April 2004. The district council was upgraded to the present-day municipal council on 21 April 2004.

The council covers nine towns in Kulai District, namely: Kulai, Saleng, Senai, Seelong, Sengkang, Sedenak, Kelapa Sawit, Ayer Bemban and Bukit Batu.

See also
 Local government in Malaysia

External links 

Majlis Perbandaran Kulai Official Website
  Town website set up by local community

2004 establishments in Malaysia
Kulai District
Local government in Johor
Municipal councils in Malaysia